The 2018–19 Women's Volleyball Thailand League is the 14th season of the Women's Volleyball Thailand League, the top Thai professional league for women's volleyball clubs, since its establishment in 2005, also known as CP Women's Volleyball Thailand League due to the sponsorship deal with Charoen Pokphand. A total of 8 teams will compete in the league. The season will begin on 27 October 2018  and is scheduled to conclude in 2019. This season will be organized by the Thailand Volleyball Association (TVA) instead Thailand Volleyball Co.,Ltd. The season started.

Supreme Chonburi are the defending champions, also the reigning Asian club champions, while the 2018 Pro Challenge champion will has entered as the promoted team from the 2018 Volleyball Pro Challenge.

Changes from last season

Team changes

Promoted clubs
Promoted from the 2018 Women's Volleyball Pro Challenge
Opart 369 (2018 Pro Challenge champion)
Rangsit University (2018 Pro Challenge runner-up)

Relegated clubs
Relegated from the 2017–18 Women's Volleyball Thailand League
Rangsit University
Cosmo Chiang Rai

Reformed club
Bangkok Glass authorize from Quint Air Force

Clubs

Personnel and sponsorship

Managerial changes

National team players
Note :: players who released during second leg transfer window;: players who registered during second leg transfer window;→: players who left club after registered during first or second leg.

National team player quotas except from regulation
Hattaya Bamrungsuk is first time in national team with Nakhon Ratchasima The Mall.
Pimpichaya Kokram is first time in national team with 3BB Nakornnont.
Chitaporn Kamlangmak is first time in national team with Thai–Denmark Khonkaen Star.
Supattra Pairoj is first time in national team with Generali Supreme Chonburi-E.Tech.
Watchareeya Nuanjam is first time in national team with Generali Supreme Chonburi-E.Tech.
Academic players will not including in national team player quota.

Foreign players

Note :: players who released during second leg transfer window;: players who registered during second leg transfer window;→: players who left club after registered during first or second leg.

Transfers

First leg

Second leg

Format

Regular season
First leg: single round-robin.
Second leg: single round-robin.

Regular season standing procedure
 Number of matches won
 Match points
 Sets ratio
 Points ratio
 Result of the last match between the tied teams

Match won 3–0 or 3–1: 3 match points for the winner, 0 match points for the loser
Match won 3–2: 2 match points for the winner, 1 match point for the loser

Finals series

Venues

Note
 Keelawes 1 Gymnasium is initiatively proposed venue in Week 4 (17 to 18 November 2018), but TVA moved venue to Mcc Hall The Mall Bangkapi.
 Chonburi Municipal Gymnasium is initiatively proposed venue in Week 5 (1 to 2 December 2018), but TVA moved venue to Mcc Hall The Mall Bangkapi.
 Khon Kaen Provincial Gymnasium is initiatively proposed venue in Week 6 and 7 (15 to 16 and 22 to 23 December 2018), but TVA moved venue to Khonkaen International Convention and Exhibition Center.

Regular season

League table

Head-to-Head results

Positions by round

Results

First leg
All times are Indochina Time (UTC+07:00).

Week 1 – Chonburi

|}

Week 2 – Nakhon Ratchasima

|}

Week 3 – Nakhon Ratchasima

|}

Week 4 – Bangkok

|}

Week 5 – Bangkok

|}

Week 6 – Khon Kaen

|}

Week 7 – Khon Kaen

|}

Second leg
All times are Indochina Time (UTC+07:00).

Week 8 – Khon Kaen

|}

Week 9 – Nonthaburi

|}

Week 10 – Nonthaburi

|}

Week 11 – Nakhon Ratchasima

|}

Week 12 – Nakhon Ratchasima

|}

Week 13 – Bangkok

|}

Week 14 – Bangkok

|}

Finals series
All times are Indochina Time (UTC+07:00).

Final Team

Venue
The final series matches are played at the MCC Hall The Mall Bang Kapi in Bangkok.

Semi-finals

|}

3rd place 

|}

Final 

|}

Final standing

Awards

Most Valuable Player
  Onuma Sittirak (Nakhon Ratchasima)

Best Best Scorer
  Kuttika Kaewpin (Nakornnonthaburi)

Best Outside Spiker
  Kuttika Kaewpin (Nakornnonthaburi)
  Wilavan Apinyapong (Supreme Chonburi)

Best Servers
  Kuttika Kaewpin (Nakornnonthaburi)

Best Middle Blocker
  Pleumjit Thinkaow (Supreme Chonburi)
  Trần Thị Bích Thủy (Quint Air Force)

Best Setter
  Kullapa Piampongsan (Khonkaen)

Best Opposite Spiker
  Malika Kanthong (Nakhon Ratchasima)

Best Libero
  Tapaphaipun Chaisri (Khonkaen)

Statistics leader

The statistics of each group follows the vis reports P2 and P5. The statistics include 6 volleyball skills; serve, reception, set, spike, block, and dig. The table below shows the top 5 ranked players in each skill plus top scorers at the completion of the tournament.

Regular season
After Leg 2 Week 7

Best Scorers

Best Spikers

Best Blockers

Best Servers

Best Diggers

Best Setters

Best Receivers

See also
 2018–19 Men's Volleyball Thailand League
 2018 Women's Volleyball Kor Royal Cup
 2018 Women's Volleyball Pro Challenge
 2018 Men's Volleyball Kor Royal Cup
 2018 Men's Volleyball Pro Challenge

References

External links 
 Official Website 

2018
Thailand League
Thailand League
Volleyball,Thailand League
Volleyball,Thailand League